Dasypeltis atra, commonly known as the montane egg-eating snake, is a species of  non-venomous snake in the family Colubridae. The species is endemic to Africa.

Geographic range
D. atra is found in Burundi, the Democratic Republic of the Congo, Ethiopia, Kenya, Rwanda, South Sudan, Tanzania, and Uganda.

Reproduction
D. atra is oviparous.

References

Further reading
Bates, Michael F.; Broadley, Donald G. (2018). "A revision of the egg-eating snakes of the genus Dasypeltis Wagler (Squamata: Colubridae: Colubrinae) in north-eastern Africa and south-western Arabia, with descriptions of three new species". Indago 34: 1-95.
Sternfeld R (1912). "'Reptilia". pp. 197–280. In: Schubotz H (editor) (1912). Wissenschaftliche Ergebnisse der Deutschen Zentral-Afrika-Expedition 1907–1908 unter Führing Adolf Friedrichs, Herzogs zu Mecklenburg. Band IV. Zoologie II. Leipzig: Klinkhardt & Biermann. 485 pp. (Dasypeltis scabra var. atra, new variety, p. 272). (in German).

Reptiles described in 1912
Reptiles of Africa
Colubrids